Mudivalla Arambam ( This is not the end, but the beginning}}) is a 2014-2014 soap opera that aired on Vendhar TV and aired Monday through Friday at 8:00PM IST. For the first time in Tamil television history, an innovative attempt in fiction brings to you stories that are set in motion from the climax of popular movies. The Show Directed by Navin Khirushna and K. Rangaraj.

Seasons

References

External links 
 Vendhar TV Website 
 Vendhar TV on YouTube

Vendhar TV television series
Tamil-language television miniseries
Tamil-language romance television series
Tamil-language thriller television series
2014 Tamil-language television series debuts
Tamil-language television shows